Contract grading is a form of grading which results from cooperation between an instructor and their student(s), and entails completion of a contracted number of assignments of specified quality that correspond to specific letter grades. These contracts often contain the following two characteristics: First, there are no finite amount of, say, "A" grades given in the class. Any student who completes the work that corresponds to a "B" grade will receive a "B". The second characteristic is that instructors and students know exactly what is expected from them to receive a certain letter grade. Contract grading may be contrasted with other grading methods such as grading on a curve or percentile systems. These curve and percentile systems include the Common Curve, Missouri Curve, and The Gaussian Curve. Grading on these curves creates an expectation that the number of "A"s and "B"s should correspond to the number of "D"s and "F"s, with the majority of students receiving a "C". In the 2010s, contract grading was discussed and promoted as a method to respond to racism within academia and, more specifically, writing in academia. Asao Inoue, a large contributor to this topic, wrote in his book Labor-Based Grading Contracts: Building Equity and Inclusion in the Compassionate Writing Classroom, "Designing fair and meaningful grading practices is about cultivating with our students an ecology, a place where every student, no matter where they come from or how they speak or write, can have access to the entire range of final course grades possible."

Overview
In traditional grading, educators determine assignments, exams, and projects before the course begins. Students are expected to follow the syllabus and complete the tasks presented. The grade the student receives is a reflection of how well they completed the pre-determined syllabus. In this system, students are expected to follow a path that reflects the syllabus.

However, the contract grading system allows each student to devise his or her own path for the class by allowing students to pick and choose which assignments or projects they intend to complete. Grades are assigned on the basis of the agreement between the student and the professor. With contract grading, students have a say in their curriculum, as well as in how their grade is ultimately assessed. For some students, this grading system requires a more active role.

Although the student decides what is to be accomplished throughout the course, as with a contract, both the student and professor must come to an agreement. After students turn in their initial contract or proposal, the teacher may make revisions or require some changes be made before a final agreement is made. A contract grade must also be signed by both parties, confirming the agreement for a particular grade. However, the contract grading system is not as binding as a business contract.  The student may resubmit the contract mid-semester provided the professor approves the changes.

Labor-based contract grading 
In 1993, Peter Elbow problematized traditional writing assessment by suggesting a shift in what to assess. When a teacher uses a letter, number, grid, symbol, or another kind of ranking system to reply to a student's writing assignment, they are evaluating according to a hypothetically unilateral standard of writing. A standard to which writing is measured, however, is subjective. In his article published in the journal College English, Elbow suggests that writing assessment be based on effort rather than on a subjective evaluation aligned with a standard.  Asao Inoue has contributed to the literature on this topic, especially in the context of the writing classroom. He emphasizes a version of contract grading called labor-based contract grading as practice of antiracist writing assessment. This form of grading is connected to the effort a students puts forth rather than a "standard" form of writing.

Hybrid Contract Grading 
There is a second form of grading contracts that is known as Hybrid Grading Contracts. Hybrid Grading Contracts combine elements of Labor-Based contracts with traditional grading contracts. Hybrid Grading Contracts assess both labor and quality of a student's work in determining a student's grade.

Implementation
Students, in addition to choosing the grade they desire and how many assignments they will complete, must also commit themselves to the completion of their contract. Once the student determines the number of works he or she chooses to complete, contracts are then signed and agreed upon.  There is a grace period for changing of contracts, but it is ultimately up to the professor to accept or to reject any proposals.  The student then has the responsibility to complete and turn in the contracted assignments, with a few deadlines to meet. First a teacher presents the grading contract to this class then the class if often given time to read over the contract. Next, if the teacher chooses to do so, the teacher will negotiate the terms of the contract. This means that the number of missed or late assignments to achieve a certain grade will be negotiated. There may or may not be a grace period to allow changes in the contract. Ultimately, all final decisions are left to the teacher. At the end of the contract, students will earn the grade that matches the terms of the contract.

Labor-based contract grading is also used to combat systemic racism in the classroom by calculating grades based on labor and having less restrictive guidelines in the classroom.

Studies and Research
In 1912–1913, Daniel Starch and Edward Charles Elliott conducted a study on the unreliability of academic grading curriculum. They found that there were no significant increases in learning in a grading system based on absolute standards. To test whether percentage based grading could truly encapsulate the accuracy of a student's performance they had high school teachers from different institutions grade sets of two student papers per subject. In their case study, they had 147 high school English teachers grade two identical English papers. The difference in score for the first paper ranged from 64% to 98% and the second ranged from 50% to 97%. It was made clear to Starch and Elliott that every instructor has their own difference in view in regards to academic performance.  The same result occurred with mathematics, two student papers were sent to 128 high school math instructors. Scores for one paper ranged from 28% to 95%. These scores were the results of whether an instructor gave credit for showing work or graded solely based on the answer the student chose. Since instructors have a different perspective on Grade A Level work, personal biases would come into play in percentage based grading.

According to a study done in 2001 by William Yarber of Purdue University found that the knowledge attained from courses using grading contract systems is equal to the knowledge attained from traditional grading systems. Additionally the study found that the attitudes of students toward learning were the same in courses that used the grading contract system and the traditional grading method.

Student reaction
A study published in 1990 received opinions about the contract grading system from 51 undergraduate education majors and 28 graduate students majoring in education at Acadia University in Nova Scotia, Canada.  Students at both education levels reacted to the contract grading system in a positive manner.  "They agreed that the grading system and assignments were made clear from the beginning, that the system was appropriate, and that grades were assigned fairly. When asked to rank the effectiveness and importance of the various aspects of contract grading, students reported that the key elements were the control they felt they had by being able to determine their grades, the clearly stated expectations for performance in the course, criterion referencing of assignments, and the mastery approach to learning."

A study conducted during the 1974–75 school year by James J. Polczynski on 280 students at a Midwest state university found that contract grading raised students instrumentality levels. The study also found that students opinion of their grade and the importance they place on their grade did not change. The largest change that the study found was that students felt a stronger assurance that a particular performance would match the grade they received better under the grading contract system then a traditional grading method. Moreover, students also reported that they felt they had more control over their grade in the course which in turn increased their level of motivation to participate in the course.

Advantages
Contract grading can enable the student to progress at his or her own pace; additionally, contract grading emphasizes learning and reduces grade competition by shifting student and teacher attention away from the result of an assignment or course and towards the processes or habits that necessarily result in academic and intellectual growth.[7] Systems of this style also encourage a cooperative learning process. By requiring instructor and student to work jointly, emphasis is added on the desires of the student and the goals he or she wishes to accomplish. According to Bucknell University, contract grading "facilitates the development of a partnership learning environment in which students are likely to retain more information, make better use of information, and be more highly motivated to learn than in teacher-directed learning environments." Due to the freedom allowed by the system, time management skills are acquired and exercised. Labor based grading contacts are seen as more fair than conventional grading contracts because course grades are determined by the amount of labor done by students and not influenced by knowledge the students had prior to the course.

Removing racism from the classroom 
 Labor-based grading contacts are seen as more fair than conventional grading contracts because course grades are determined by the amount of labor done by students and not influenced by knowledge the students had prior to the course. Labor-based grading contracts seek to mitigate racial disparities in grading outcomes. A student's grade under a labor-based grading contract is solely determined by the work the student puts into the course rather than their prior knowledge of the subject. Evaluating a student's performance in the course based on knowledge alone can lead to racially disparate outcomes. It is important to note that only labor-based grading contracts achieve this; because hybrid contracts require a standard of quality, they are still susceptible to said disparities.

Disadvantages
Contract grading could be viewed as threatening to students who have relied upon structured grading processes. Increased responsibility may cause anxiety for students expecting more common approaches. In addition to concerns for the individual student, contract grading is largely dependent upon implementation by the instructor. An instructor may, through this grading system, cause students to take on greater responsibility for learning and success while simultaneously restricting freedom. Contract grading systems are susceptible to paternalism on the part of the instructor. Whereas the students take on the responsibility of choosing assignments, they may not also actively determine expectations.

References

Curricula
Pedagogy